Nizhneye Bobino is a rural locality (a selo) in Maloustyinsky Selsoviet, Mechetlinsky District, Bashkortostan, Russia. The population was 643 as of 2010. There are 8 streets.

Geography 
Nizhneye Bobino is located 10 km southwest of Bolsheustyikinskoye (the district's administrative centre) by road. Maloustyikinskoye is the nearest rural locality.

References 

Rural localities in Mechetlinsky District